Radhika Narayan is an Indian actress, working primarily in mainstream Kannada cinema, and in Kannada theater, is a method actress who is known for the selection of her projects.

Early life
Radhika Narayan was born in the Krishna Temple city Udupi, Karnataka. She is an engineering graduate from Vidya Vikas Institute of Engineering & Technology, in the Heritage city Mysore. Besides being a film actress, she is a trained Kathak dancer, who is actively involved with WeMove Theatre movement and also acted in short films. She has also worked as a model from earlier in her career. She was also a yoga instructor in Swami Vivekananda Yoga Anusandhana Samsthana in Bangalore.

Career
In her big screen debut in Anup Bhandari's directorial Kannada thriller RangiTaranga (2015), she plays the protagonist character as Indu Suvarna, the wife of Gautam Suvarna (Nirup Bhandari). The movie was critically acclaimed for its screenplay, score and cinematography. Due to its word-of-mouth marketing the movie was a blockbuster in Karnataka and got a tremendous response in its worldwide release. Following Rangitaranga, Radhika played a supporting role in Pawan Kumar's thriller U Turn (2016).
Recently, she has appeared in the Black Stone agarbatti's advertisement.

Filmography

Awards and nominations

References

External links
 
Facebook page
Instagram

Living people
Year of birth missing (living people)
21st-century Indian actresses
Actresses from Mysore
Actresses in Kannada cinema
Actresses from Karnataka
Indian Internet celebrities
Indian film actresses